Tom Short is an American traveling campus evangelist who lives in Columbus, Ohio.

Career

Campus evangelism
Tom Short was ordained in 1977 by elders of The "Blitz" Movement at Solid Rock Church (now Linworth Road Church) in Columbus, Ohio. Missionaries of the movement at the time operated by filling buses with people, musical instruments and tracts in order to execute a 2- or 3-day campus blitz. They used singing, intensive tract distribution and organized sidewalk canvassing to draw impromptu crowds and to achieve saturation of the intellectual marketplace. By 1980, Short began preaching on campuses while stationed at a church in College Park, Maryland, becoming a fixture outside the Hornbake Library on the University of Maryland campus.

In 2004, Tom Short spoke in a non-debate forum along with Jamal Badawi, a renowned Islamic scholar at Iowa State University. The two featured speakers presented their religions' view of Jesus and answered questions in the forum, co-sponsored by Islam on Campus and the local Great Commission Churches student group.

Pastoral work
Short briefly served as pastor of Woodstock Community Church in Roswell, Georgia in 1990 while conducting services in the Roswell Holiday Inn, and then moved to San Diego to pastor MountainView Community Church.

References

External links
 

American evangelicals
Great Commission church movement people
Living people
Campus preachers
Year of birth missing (living people)